Touching Heaven Changing Earth is the seventh album in the live praise and worship series of contemporary worship music by Hillsong Church. The album reached No. 31 on the Billboard Top Contemporary Christian Albums Chart.

Making of the album 

Touching Heaven Changing Earth was recorded live at the new Hills Christian Life Centre building by Darlene Zschech and the Hillsong team.

The majority of the songs were written by Zschech, Russell Fragar and Reuben Morgan

Track listing 

 "That's What We Came Here For" (Russell Fragar and Darlene Zschech) — 03:50 — worship leader: Darlene Zschech
 "Touching Heaven, Changing Earth" (Reuben Morgan) — 03:52 — worship leader: Darlene Zschech & Steve McPherson
 "Church On Fire" (Fragar) — 03:24 — worship leader: Gilbert Clark b. Lucy Fisher & Darlene Zschech 
 "Lord Your Goodness" (Morgan) — 03:48 — worship leader: Darlene Zschech
 "Holy Spirit Rain Down" (Fragar) — 06:44 — worship leader: Darlene Zschech
 "You Are Holy" (Morgan) — 05:28 — worship leader: Darlene Zschech
 "Jesus You Gave It All" (Craig Gower) — 06:06 — worship leader: Darlene Zschech
 "Yes And Amen" (Fragar) — 04:00 — worship leaders: Darlene Zschech & Jayne Denham, b. Gilbert Clark
 "You Gave Me Love" (Morgan) — 04:00 — worship leader: Darlene Zschech & Mark Stevens
 "Glorified" (Steve McPherson) — 04:06 — worship leaders: Steve McPherson & Darlene Zschech
 "I Will Bless You Lord" (Zschech) — 05:16 — worship leaders: Miriam Webster & Rob Eastwood
 "My Greatest Love Is You" (Fragar) — 04:31 — worship leaders: Steve McPherson, Mark Stevens, Rob Eastwood, Scott Haslem, Gilbert Clark
 "Jesus You're All I Need" (Zschech) — 06:01 — worship leader: Darlene Zschech
 "The Potter's Hand" (Zschech) — 07:38 — worship leader: Darlene Zschech
 "Touching Heaven, Changing Earth (Reprise)" — 02:51
b. = lead backing vocal

Personnel 

 Brian Houston – executive producer
 Darlene Zschech  – producer, worship leader
 Russell Fragar – producer, piano, music director
 Marty Sampson – vocalist
 Steve McPherson – vocalist
 Miriam Webster – vocalist
 Gilbert Clark – vocalist
 Rebecca Mesiti – vocalist
 Erica Crocker – vocalist
 Donia Makedonez – vocalist
 Jayne Denham – vocalist
 Lucy Fisher – vocalist
 Lisa Young – vocalist
 Mark Stevens – vocalist
 Scott Haslem – vocalist
 Craig Gower – keyboards
 David Moyse – acoustic guitar, electric guitar
 Reuben Morgan – acoustic guitar
 Kevin O'Connor - acoustic guitar
 Ian Fisher – bass 
 Paul Ewing – bass
 Rick Peteriet – drums
 Ross Peacock – drums 
 Chris Miline – percussion
 Mark Gregory – trumpet, brass director  
 Dominic Sirone – trumpet
 Karl Stone – trombone
 Cathy Coluccio – saxophone
 Karen Parker – tenor saxophone 
 Hills Christian Life Centre Choir – choir
 Tanya Riches – choir conductor

References 

1998 live albums
Hillsong Music live albums